Fletcher High School may refer to:

Duncan U. Fletcher High School, Neptune Beach, Florida, United States
Fletcher High School, Gweru, Zimbabwe